The Catholic Church in Singapore is part of the worldwide Catholic Church, under the spiritual leadership of the Pope in Rome. In 2016, the Catholic Foundation of Singapore reported the Catholic population in Singapore to be over 373,000. 

According to the 2020 census, 18.9% of Singaporeans identify as Christians – 37.1% of which identified as Catholic and the 62.9% as 'Other Christians' (chiefly Protestants).

It is currently led by William Cardinal Goh, the 4th Archbishop of the Catholic Archdiocese of Singapore.

History
Catholicism in Singapore has its roots from the Portuguese presence in Asia. It is believed that the first Catholic priest set foot in Singapore in 1821, two years after Stamford Raffles' landing, to attend to the needs of the growing community consisting largely of British colonialists and some Chinese; however, it is probable that there had been Portuguese missionaries operating out of Malacca in Singapore during the Portuguese period, 1511–1641, prior to the British conquest.

Founder
Acknowledged as the founder of the Catholic Church here, Father Jean-Marie Beurel was notable for initiating the building of several Catholic churches, such as the Cathedral of the Good Shepherd and for establishing the first Missionary schools in Singapore. Of the initial Missionary schools, Saint Joseph's Institution, founded in 1852, was in the care of the Lasallian Brothers while the Convent of the Holy Infant Jesus, founded in 1854, was in the care of the Sisters of the Infant Jesus. These institutions catered to students of all faiths and backgrounds and many of the non-Catholics subsequently became converts.

Subdivisions
Historically (prior to independence in 1965), Catholic communities were divided along racial lines – centred along the entire length of Queen St in town:
 The vast majority of Catholics in the early years of Singapore would comprise the Eurasians, who were chiefly located in the Waterloo St and Serangoon Road areas and were members of St Joseph's Church (143 Victoria St, rear of Queen St), the former Portuguese Mission church, along with two schools, St Anthony's Boys School and St Anthony's Convent.
 The British and other Europeans congregated at the Cathedral of the Good Shepherd. (1A Queen St)
 Tamil Catholics, added the Church of Our Lady of Lourdes on Ophir Road, at the other end of Queen St.
 Chinese Catholics in the city area were found at Sts Peter and Paul (Queen St), and the Sacred Heart Church (Tank Road). 

Conversion to Catholicism among the Chinese community in the 19th century was met with disdain among Chinese immigrant societies in Singapore. Many of these Chinese Catholic converts, a large number of whom were wealthy plantation owners, were frequently subjected to harassment from fellow Chinese and working class organised gangs. These were mainly located in the Upper Serangoon and Hougang areas where the Church of the Nativity of the Blessed Virgin Mary is located in what was traditionally a Teochew speaking heartland.

Japanese occupation
During World War II, in an attempt to manage the growing needs of the local people in Singapore, many Catholics of Eurasian and Chinese ethnicity were deported to Bahau, also aptly called "Fuji Village" at that time, to be self-sufficient in their own food supply.

Contemporary era
In 2005, Singapore held an exhibition, dubbed Journey of Faith, on artefacts from Vatican City in the Asian Civilisations Museum at Empress Building, Catholic-oriented artifacts, focusing on art and history, were put on display from June to October 2005.

The Catholic Church in Singapore was under dual jurisdiction for most of its history, one tracing authority from the Vicariate Apostolate of Siam down to the present Archdiocese of Singapore and the other with the authority from the Portuguese Mission first from the Archdiocese of Goa and then the Diocese of Macau. This was a legacy of the padroado pronouncement in the 16th century. Dual jurisdiction was ended in 1981, when the Portuguese Mission handed over St Joseph's Church to the Archdiocese of Singapore and, thus, the whole island of Singapore was brought under the Archdiocese of Singapore.

On May 29, 2022, Pope Francis announced that Archbishop of Singapore William Goh would be appointed as a cardinal in August of that year, making him the first native Singaporean cardinal in history.

List of Catholic churches in Singapore

Cathedral of the Good Shepherd 
Church of Sts. Peter and Paul
Church of Our Lady of Lourdes
Church of St. Joseph (Victoria Street) (Kallang)
Church of Divine Mercy
Church of St. Bernadette
Church of St. Michael the Archangel
Church of St. Teresa
Church of the Sacred Heart
Church of Our Lady of Perpetual Succour
Church of Saint Alphonsus (Novena Church)
Church of the Holy Family
Church of Our Lady Queen of Peace
Church of St. Stephen
Church of the Holy Trinity
Blessed Sacrament Church
Church of St. Francis of Assisi
Church of St. Mary of the Angels
Church of the Holy Cross
Church of St. Anthony
Church of Christ the King
Church of St. Ignatius
Church of Our Lady Star of the Sea
Church of the Holy Spirit
Church of the Nativity of the Blessed Virgin Mary
Church of the Risen Christ
Church of St. Francis Xavier
Church of St. Vincent de Paul
Church of St. Joseph (Bukit Timah)
Church of the Immaculate Heart of Mary
Church of St. Anne
Church of the Transfiguration (COTT)

List of foreign Catholic communities in Singapore
Indonesian Catholic Community in Singapore (KKIS - Keluarga Katolik Indonesia di Singapura)
Indonesian Charismatic Catholic Holy Spirit Prayer Group (KKIHS - Karismatik Katolik Indonesia Holy Spirit)

Education

The Catholic Church operates kindergartens, primary schools, secondary schools and a junior college, Catholic Junior College. Some schools are operated by the archdiocese and others are under the trusteeship of various religious orders such as the Lasallian Brothers and the Sisters of the Infant Jesus.

See also 
 Archdiocese of Singapore
 List of Catholic churches in Singapore
 Christianity in Singapore

Further reading 
 One hundred years' history of the Chinese in Singapore, by Song Ong Siang  
 Journey of Faith: Art and History from the Vatican Collections by Asian Civilisations Museum 
 Syonan: My story the Japanese occupation of Singapore

References

External links 
 The official Website of the Archdiocese of Singapore
 The Website of the French-speaking catholic community of Singapore
 The Catholic Church in Singapore by GCatholic.org
 Vatican treasures

 
Catholic Church in Asia
Catholic Church by country